This is the present list of all officially documented extensions for the PHP programming language.

.NET
Apache
BCMath
Brotli
Bzip2
Calendars
CCVS
ClibPDF
COM
cURL
DB++
IBM Db2
dBase
DBM
dbx
DOM XML
FileMaker Pro
filePro
GNU FriBidi
FrontBase
FTP
GD Graphics Library
Gettext
GNU Multi-Precision Library
Hyperwave
iconv
IMAP, POP3 and NNTP
Informix
Ingres II
InterBase
IRC

LDAP
Lotus Notes
mailparse
MCAL
Mcrypt
MCVE
Mhash
MIME Functions
Ming
mnoGoSearch
Mohawk
MS-SQL
mSQL
muscat
MySQL
Ncurses
ODBC
OpenSSL
Oracle
Ovrimos SQL
PayFlow Pro
PDF
PDO
Phalcon
POSIX
PostgreSQL
Printer
Pspell
QT-Dom
GNU Readline
GNU Recode
Regular expressions
Semaphores
SESAM
Session Handling
Shared memory
SMTP
SNMP
SimpleXML
Sockets
SQLite
Streams
Sybase
Token
vpopmail
WDDX
Win32 API
xajax
XML (Xpath)
XML-RPC
XSLT
YAZ
Yellow pages / NIS
ZIP
Zlib
Wjs

See also
 Extension Categorization from the official PHP Manual

PHP software